Season 1875–76 was the first season in which Heart of Midlothian competed at a Scottish national level, entering the Scottish Cup for the first time.

Overview 
Hearts entered the Scottish Cup for the first time reaching the second round.

Hearts received a boost by qualifying for the second round despite two no scoring draws against 3rd Edinburgh RV in the first round. Hearts were knocked out 2–0 in the second round against Drumpellier.

Results

Friendlies

Scottish Cup

Edinburgh FA Cup

See also
List of Heart of Midlothian F.C. seasons

References 

 Statistical Record 75-76

External links 
 Official Club website

Heart of Midlothian F.C. seasons
Hearts